The 1963 Australian Touring Car Championship was a CAMS sanctioned motor racing title for drivers of Appendix J Touring Cars. It was contested over a single 25 lap, 50 mile (80 km) race at the Mallala Race Circuit in South Australia on 15 April 1963 and was the fourth running of the Australian Touring Car Championship. The race was won by Bob Jane, driving a Jaguar Mark 2 4.1.

Race
Much of the interest in the 1963 title centred on an anticipated duel between Bob Jane's much developed Jaguar Mark 2 and Norm Beechey's new Chevrolet Impala. The confrontation failed to eventuate after the Impala blew its engine the previous weekend and was a non-starter. Beechey raced his backup car, a Holden 48-215. Jane took pole position by one tenth of a second over the Valiant of Ern Abbott, with Clem Smith's Valiant another second behind. The second row comprised the Holden of Clive Millis and the Fiat 1500 of Pat James.

Beechey retired on lap 1 after starting sixth, while Jane led from Abbott, Smith, Peter Manton, John Brindley, James, Harry Firth, George Reynolds and Richard Thurston. Jane set a new lap record of 1:57.2 on lap 2 as he extended his lead, while Firth passed James, Brindley and Manton to move into fourth place by lap 7. Abbott was able to stay with Jane as the two pulled away from Smith in third, who was ten seconds behind at half distance. Both Valiant drivers then encountered problems: Abbott's brakes began to fade and he fell back into the clutches of Smith, but Smith was low on fuel and had to conserve. Firth also had problems, with a bent throttle linkage putting him under pressure from Manton. Manton attempted to pass Firth at the last corner but was unable to take the place.

Jane went on to win Jaguar's fourth and final Australian Touring Car Championship, leading Abbott home by seven seconds, with Smith a further 22 seconds adrift. Firth finished one lap down in fourth ahead of Manton, Millis and Reynolds.

1963 also saw the first New Zealander to compete in the Australian Touring Car Championship. Car 64, an Austin A90 driven by C.J.N. (Nigel) Roskilly.

Results
Class winners are indicated by bold text.

Statistics
 Pole position: Bob Jane, 1:57.9
 Fastest lap: Bob Jane, 1:57.2
 Race distance: 25 laps, 84.50 km
 Average speed: 101.27 km/h

References

Further reading
 Bob Jane Makes It a Double, Australian Motor Sport, June 1963, pages 63–65

External links
 1963 Australian touring car racing images

Australian Touring Car Championship seasons
Touring Car Championship